Tang Zhongming (1897–1980) was a Chinese engineer and inventor. Zhong-Ming Tang was born to a poor family in 1897. He attended elementary and middle school in Henan province graduating from Huaiqing Middle School at age 19, when he then attended Kaifeng Teachers Training Institute and the Beijing French School. From June 1919 to 1926 he studied in France. 	

Zhong-Ming Tang returned to China in 1926 during the time of the world oil crisis. In China (Kaifeng and Zhengzhou) he worked to develop a charcoal powered car to aid in China's energy efficiency and independence, which had been an issue during World War I. In 1931, he created an internal combustion engine powered by charcoal  and mounted it in an automobile. In 1932 he founded Chung Ming Machinery Co., Ltd. in Shanghai, to produce commercially available charcoal fueled cars. During World War II (1937) the charcoal car grew in popularity due to the high price of oil.  His charcoal cars were popular until the early 1950s. Starting then, their popularity dropped, especially in Southwest China where inexpensive fuel was easily accessible. Thereafter, the rest of China stopped buying charcoal-powered cars as much as before.

External links
在开封研制成功的木炭汽车

References

Chinese automotive pioneers
20th-century Chinese inventors
Engineers from Henan
1980 deaths
1897 births